Burke is an Anglo-Norman Irish surname, deriving from the ancient Anglo-Norman and Hiberno-Norman noble dynasty, the House of Burgh. In Ireland, the descendants of William de Burgh (circa 1160}}–1206) had the surname de Burgh, which was gaelicised in Irish as de Búrca and over the centuries became Búrc, then Burke, and Bourke.

Notable people with this name include:

Surname

A

 Adam Burke (disambiguation), multiple people, including:
 Adam Burke (rower), (1971–2018), Irish ocean rower
 Adam Burke (comedian), American stand-up comedian, writer, and comic artist
 Adrian P. Burke (1904–2000), New York judge
 Aedanus Burke (1743–1802), Irish-American soldier, judge, and politician
 Aggrey Burke (born 1943), British psychiatrist and academic
 Alafair Burke (born 1969), mystery novel writer and Court TV commentator
 Alan Burke (1922–1992), American conservative television and radio talk show host
 Alan Burke (director) (1923–2007), Australian writer and film director and producer
 Albert Burke (disambiguation), multiple people, including:
 Albert E. Burke (1919–1999), Yale University professor and public educational television pioneer
 Albert Burke (tennis) (1901–1958), Irish tennis player
 Alex Burke (born 1977), Scottish former professional footballer
 Alexander Burke (born 1983) is an American musician, producer, writer and actor
 Alexandra Burke (born 1988), British singer, songwriter and actress
 Alfred Burke (1918–2011), British actor who starred in the ITV series Public Eye
 Alice Burke (politician) or Alice Driscoll Burke (1892–1974), American politician
 Alice Burke (footballer), (born 2002), Australian rules footballer
 Alicia Burke, Jamaican fashion model
 Montel Vontavious Porter or Alvin Antonio Burke Jr or Hassan Hamin Assad (born 1973), professional wrestler
 Ambrose Burke (1895–1998), English professor and Catholic priest 
 Andrew Burke (disambiguation), multiple people, including:
 Andrew H. Burke (1850–1918), American politician who served as governor of North Dakota
 Andrew Burke (poet) (born 1944), Australian poet
 Andrew Burke (sailor) (1949–2009), Barbadian Olympic sailor
 Angela Brown-Burke, Jamaican politician
 Anna Burke (born 1966), Australian politician
 Anne Burke (disambiguation), multiple people, including:
 Anne Burke (writer) (fl.1780–1805), Irish Gothic novelist
 Anne M. Burke (born 1944), Illinois Supreme Court Justice for Cook County, Illinois
 Anthony D. Burke (born 1966), Australian political theorist and international relations scholar
 Antoine Burke (born 1975), Irish athlete
 Antonee Burke-Gilroy (born 1997), English-born Australian association football player
 Antonella Gambotto-Burke or Antonella Gambotto (born 1965), Italian-Australian author and journalist
 Aoife de Búrca (1885–1974), born Eva Burke, Red Cross nurse during the Irish Easter Rising
 Arizona John Burke, see John Burke
 Arleigh Burke or Arleigh Albert Burke (1901–1996), former Admiral of the United States Navy
 Ashton Burke (2006)
 Augustus Nicholas Burke (1838–1891), Irish painter
 Austin-Emile Burke (1922–2011), Canadian Prelate of the Catholic Church
 Autumn Burke (born 1973), American politician

B

 Barbara Burke (1917–1998), British and South African sprint runner
 Barbara Burke Hubbard (born 1948), American science writer
 Bernard Burke or John Bernard Burke (1814–1892), British genealogist, editor of Burke's Peerage
 Bernie Burke or Bernie M. Burke Jr, American ice hockey player
 Berny Burke or Berny Thomas Burke Montiel (born 1996) is a Costa Rican footballer 
 Bessie Burke (1891–1968), African American teacher 
 Beulah Burke or Beulah Elizabeth Burke (1885–1975), American founder of the first African-American sorority
 Bill Burke (athlete) (born 1969), American middle-distance runner
 Billy Burke (disambiguation), multiple people, including:
 Billy Burke (actor) (born 1966), American actor
 Billy Burke (evangelist) (born 1953), Pentecostal faith healer
 Billy Burke (golfer) (1902–1972), professional golfer
 Billy Burke (baseball) (1889–1967), Major League Baseball player
 Billy Burke (hurler) (1912–1995), Irish hurler
 Billy Burke (firefighter) (1955–2001), sacrificed his life when the World Trade Centers collapsed
 Billy Burke (criminal) or William "Billy the Kid" Burke *1858–1919), American gangster 
 Bill Burke (athlete) (born 1969), American middle-distance runner
 Bill Burke (photographer) (born 1943), American documentary photographer
 Billie Burke (1884–1970), American stage and screen actress
 Willie Burke (born 1972), Irish footballer
 Bobby Burke or Robert James Burke (1907–1971), American baseball player
 Bobby Burke (footballer), (born 1934), Northern Irish former professional footballer 
 Brendan Burke or Brendan Gilmore Burke (1988–2010), American athlete
 Brendan Burke (soccer), (born 1982), American soccer coach
 Brendan Burke (sportscaster), (born 1984) American sportscaster 
 Brian Burke (disambiguation), multiple people, including:
 Brian Burke (Australian politician) (born 1947), Australian politician and former premier of Western Australia
 Brian Burke (American politician) (born 1958), Wisconsin politician and legislator
 Brian Burke (ice hockey) (born 1955), American ice hockey executive and GM of the Toronto Maple Leafs
 Brian Burke (American football) (born 1935), former American football player and coach
 Brian Burke (Gaelic footballer) (born 1966), Irish retired Gaelic footballer
 Brock Burke (born 1996, American professional baseball pitcher
 Brooke Burke (born 1971), actress and model
 Bryan Burke (born 1989), American soccer player
 Byron Burke, American record producer

C

 Callahan Burke (born 1997), American ice hockey player
 Cam Burke (born 1987), Canadian amateur golfer
 Caroline Burke or Caroline Berg (1913–1964), American actress, producer, writer, and art collector
 Carolyn Burke (born 1940), Australian-born American translator, art critic, and author 
 Catherine Burke (disambiguation), multiple people, including:
 Kathy Burke or Katherine Burke (born 1964), British actress
 Katharine Alice Burke (1875–1924), British chemist
 Ceelle Burke, American musician and performer
 Ces Burke or Cecil Burke (1914–1997), New Zealand cricketer
 Chand Burke, Indian actress
 Charles Burke (disambiguation), multiple people, including:
 Charles H. Burke (1861–1944), American politician
 Charles Burke (British Army officer) (1882–1917)
 Charlie Burke, former head coach of the Hong Kong National Men and Women's cricket teams
 Chuck Burke (born 1930), American Olympic speed skater
 Cheryl Burke (born 1984), American professional dancer
 Chesya Burke, American editor, educator and author
 Chris Burke (disambiguation), multiple people, including:
 Christopher Burke (Irish revolutionary) (1898-1964), Irish revolutionary, hunger striker and sportsman
 Chris Burke (actor) (born 1965), American actor and folk singer
 Chris Burke (baseball) (born 1980), Major League Baseball player
 Chris Burke (footballer) (born 1983), Scottish footballer
 Christopher Burke (design writer), typeface designer and author on typography
 Christopher J. Burke, U.S. Magistrate Judge of the U.S. District Court for the District of Delaware
 Christopher Burke, guitarist with Beach Fossils
 Christopher Burke, astronomer Ursa Minor Dwarf
 Chris Burke (priest), Vice-Dean and Canon Precentor of Sheffield Cathedral, and Archdeacon-designate of Barking
 Chris Burke-Gaffney, Canadian songwriter and producer
 Christie Burke (born 1989), Canadian actress
 Christy Burke, Irish independent Dublin politician
 Ciarán Burke (born 1999), Irish hurler 
 Clarence Burke Jr (1949–2013), American singer and member of the Five Stairsteps
 Clem Burke (born 1954), American drummer for the group Blondie
 Colm Burke (born 1957), Irish Fine Gael politician 
 Conor Burke (disambiguation), multiple people, including:
 Conor Burke (rugby union), (born 1974), Irish rugby union player
 Conor Burke (hurler), (born 1998) is an Irish hurler
 Conor Burke (baseball), or Conor O. Burke, American baseball coach and former outfielder
 Cormac Burke (disambiguation), multiple people, including:
 Cormac Burke (footballer), (born 1993) is a Northern Irish association footballer
 Cormac Burke (priest)
Cory Burke (born 1991), Jamaican professional footballer
Courtney Burke (born 1994), American ice hockey defenseman
Cyril Burke (Australian rules footballer), (1905–1984), Australian rules footballer 
Cyril Burke (1925–2010), Australian rugby union player

D

 Daithí Burke (born 1992) is an Irish hurler and Gaelic footballer
 Dan Burke (disambiguation), multiple people, including:
 Dan Burke (baseball) (1868–1933), MLB utility player
 Dan Burke (basketball) (born 1959), NBA assistant coach
 Daniel Burke (executive) (1929–2011), former president of Capital Cities Communications and American Broadcasting Corporation
 Daniel J. Burke (born 1951), former Democratic member of the Illinois House of Representatives
 Daniel Burke (disambiguation), multiple people, including:
 Daniel J. Burke (born 1951), former Democratic member of the Illinois House of Representatives
 Dan Burke (baseball) (1868–1933), Major League Baseball player
 Daniel Burke (Australian politician) (1827–1927), member of the Tasmanian House of Assembly
 Daniel Burke (executive) (1929–2011), former president of the American Broadcasting Corporation
 Daniel Burke (rower) (born 1974), Australian rower
 Daniel W. Burke (1841–1911), American soldier and Medal of Honor recipient
 Dave Burke (disambiguation), multiple people, including:
 David Burke (politician) (born 1967), Ohio politician
 Dave Burke (Australian footballer) (1916–1987), Australian rules footballer
 David Burke (disambiguation), multiple people, including:
 David Burke (British actor) (born 1934), British television actor
 David Burke (American actor) (born 1967), American television actor
 David Burke (author), language books author
 David J. Burke (born 1948), producer, screenwriter and film and television director
 David Burke (Australian footballer) (born 1959), Australian rules footballer
 David Burke (English footballer) (born 1960), English footballer
 David Burke (boxer) (born 1975), English boxer
 David Burke (Galway hurler) (born 1990), Irish hurler for Galway
 David Burke (Kilkenny hurler) (born 1981), Irish hurler for Kilkenny and Wexford
 David Burke (athlete) in 1986 IAAF World Cross Country Championships – Junior men's race
 David Burke (soccer), played for Albany BWP Highlanders
 Davy Burke, Irish Gaelic football manager and former player
 David Burke (politician) (born 1967), member of the Ohio House of Representatives
 David Burke (botanist) (1854–1897), English botanist
 David Burke (chef) (born 1962), chef and restaurateur
 David W. Burke (1935–2014), American television news executive
 David Eric Burke, Irish businessman working in Indonesia as the chief operating officer of Visi Media Asia
 David A. Burke (1952–1987), American hijacker and former employee who caused the crash of Pacific Southwest Airlines Flight 1771
 David Burke (neurophysiologist) (born ), Australian expert in spinal and brain trauma
 Dean Burke or Kenneth Dean Burke (born 1957), American Republican politician and member of the Georgia State Senate 
 Declan Burke (born 1972), Irish musician
 Delta Burke (born 1956), American actress and producer
 Denis Burke (disambiguation), multiple people, including:
 Denis Burke (Irish politician) (1904–1971), Irish politician, senator (1948–1961)
 Denis Burke (Australian politician) (born 1948), Australian politician, Chief Minister of the Northern Territory (1999–2001)
 Dennis K. Burke (born 1962), U.S. Attorney for the District of Arizona (2009–2011)
 Desmond Lardner-Burke (1909–1984), politician in Rhodesia
 Dominic Burke (disambiguation), multiple people, including:
 Dominic Burke (c. 1603 – 1649) was an Irish Dominican priest and political agent
 Dominic Burke (bishop) (1639–1704), Irish Roman Catholic Bishop of Elphin from 1671 to 1704
 Dominick Burke (died 1747), Irish politician
 Dominic Burke (businessman) (born 1958), British businessman
 Don Burke (disambiguation), multiple people, including:
 Don Burke (born 1947) is an Australian television presenter and horticulturist
 Donald Burke, an American infectious diseases researcher
 Don Burke (American football) (born February 7, 1926), an American football player
 Donal Burke (born 1998), Irish hurler 
 Donna Burke, Australian singer, voice actress and businesswoman
 Donna Burke (luger), (born 1954), American luger
 Doris Burke or Doris Sable, American sports announcer and analyst
 Douglas Burke (disambiguation), multiple people, including:
 Doug Burke (tennis) (born 1963), Jamaican professional tennis player
 Doug Burke (water polo) (born 1957), American Olympic water polo player

E

 Éanna Burke (born 1995), Irish hurler 
 Edmond W. Burke (1935–2020), American jurist
 Edmund Burke (disambiguation), multiple people, including:
 Edmund Bourke (1761–1821) or Edmund Burke (1761–1821), Danish statesman
 Edmund Burke (1729–1797), Anglo-Irish statesman and political philosopher
 Edmond de Burgh (or de Burke) (1298–1338), Irish knight
 Edmund Bourke (1761–1821), Danish statesman
 Edmund Burke (congressman) (1809–1882), U.S. Representative for New Hampshire
 Edmund Burke (architect) (1850–1919), Canadian architect
 Edmund Burke III (born 1940), U.S. historian
 Edmund Burke Fairfield (1821–1904), American minister, educator and politician
 E. Michael Burke (1916–1987), U.S. intelligence officer and business executive
 Sir Edmund Burke, 2nd Baronet (died c. 1686) of the Burke baronets
 Eddie Burke (1905–1993), Canadian ice hockey player
 Edward Burke (disambiguation), multiple people, including:
 Edward A. Burke (1839–1928), Louisiana State Treasurer
 Edward T. Burke (1870–1935), North Dakota Supreme Court justice
 Edward J. Burke (1876–1935), Wisconsin legislator
 Edward R. Burke (1880–1968), American politician
 Edward M. Burke (born 1943), Chicago, Illinois Alderman
 Eddie Burke (baseball) (1866–1907), American baseball player
 Edward Burke (American football) (1907–1967), selected to the 1928 College Football All-America Team
 Edward Burke (cricketer) (born 1870), Jamaican cricketer
 Ed Burke (hammer thrower) (born 1940), hammer thrower, American flagbearer at 1984 Olympic games
 Edward Burke (basketball) (1945–2009), American basketball coach
 Edward Burke (priest) (1847–1915), priest, president of Carlow College, and founder of St. Joseph's Academy
 Ed Burke (musician) (1909–1988), American musician
 Ted Burke (1877–1967), Australian rules footballer
 Edwin J. Burke (1889–1944), American screenwriter
 Elena Burke or Romana Elena Burgues Gonzalez (1928–2002), Cuban singer
 Elijah Burke (born 1981), American professional wrestler
 Elizabeth Burke (disambiguation), multiple people, including:
 Elizabeth Burke-Plunkett, née Elizabeth Burke (1862–1944), an Irish activist
 Betty Burke, alias of Bonnie Prince Charlie
 Elmer "Trigger" Burke (1917–1958), American hitman
 Ernest Burke (1924–2004), American baseball player

F

 Fergus Burke (born 1999), New Zealand rugby union player 
 Fintan Burke (born 1997), Irish hurler 
 Florrie Burke (1918–1995), Irish footballer
 Florrie R. Burke, American human rights advocate
 Frances Burke (disambiguation), multiple people, including:
 Frances Burke, Countess of Clanricarde (1567–1633), English noblewoman
 Frances Marie Burke (1922–2017), Miss America 1940
 Frances Mary Burke (1904–1994) was an Australian artist
 Francis Burke (disambiguation), multiple people, including:
 Francis Burke (Franciscan) (died 1697), Irish Franciscan friar and writer
 Francis Burke (bishop) (died 1723), Irish Roman Catholic archbishop of Tuam
 Francis Burke (Dean of Elphin) (1834-1904), priest of the Church of Ireland
 Frank Burke (disambiguation), multiple people, including:
 Frank Burke (United States Army officer) (1918–1988), American Army officer and Medal of Honor recipient
 Frank G. Burke (1927–2015), Acting Archivist of the United States
 Frank W. Burke (1920–2007), American politician
 Frank Burke (Australian politician) (1876–1949), Speaker of the New South Wales Legislative Assembly
 Frank Burke (baseball) (1880–1946), American baseball player
 Frank Burke (hurler) (born 1952), Irish hurler
 Frank Burke (dual player) (1895–1987), Irish hurler and Gaelic footballer
 Frankie Burke (1915–1983), American actor
 Fred Burke (1893–1940), American armed robber and contract killer

G

 Geoffrey Burke (1913–1999), English Roman Catholic bishop
 George Burke (disambiguation), multiple people, including:
 George Burke (cricketer) (1847–1920), English cricketer
 George Thew Burke (1776–1854), soldier, merchant and political figure in Upper Canada
 George J. Burke (1886–1950), judge during the Nuremberg Trials
 George Thew Burke (1776–1854), Canadian soldier, merchant and politician
 Georgia Burke (1878–1984), actress
 Gerald Burke (1930–1994), Australian rules footballer
 Gerry Burke, Irish hurler 
 Gillian Burke (born 1974/1975), British natural history television programme producer and voiceover artist
 Glenn Burke (1952–1995), American baseball player
 Gordon Burke (born 1941), American politician
 Graham Burke (born 1993), Irish footballer
 Greg Burke (disambiguation), multiple people, including:
 Greg Burke (athletic director), director of athletics for Northwestern State University
 Greg Burke (baseball) (born 1982), Major League Baseball relief pitcher who played for San Diego and the New York Mets
 Greg Burke (journalist) (born 1959), American former TV news correspondent and adviser to Pope Francis
 Greg Burke (rugby league) (born 1993), rugby league player
 Gregory Burke (born 1968), Scottish playwright
 Gregory Burke (curator), Canadian museum director, writer and curator

H

 Hannah Burke (born 1988), English professional golfer
 Harold P. Burke (1895–1981), American judge 
 Harry E. Burke (1878–1963), American forest entomologist
 Heather Burke, Australian historical archaeologist 
 Helen Burke, Countess Clanricarde, or Helen MacCarty or Helen FitzGerald (c.1641–1722), Irish peeress 
 Henry Burke (disambiguation), multiple people, including:
 Henry Farnham Burke (1859–1930), British genealogist, Garter Principal King of Arms
 Henry Lardner-Burke (1916–1970), South African flying ace
 Honora Burke (1674–1698), an Irish aristocrat married to Patrick Sarsfield and the Duke of Berwick

I
 Ian Burke Irish Gaelic football player
 Ingrid Burke or "Indy" Burke, American botanist and academic
 Irwin Burke (born 1916), Barbadian cricketer

• James P. Burke 1930-2004 Buffalo Soldier and Korean War Veteran 

 J. C. Burke (born 1965), Australian author
 J. Herbert Burke (1913–1993), American Republican politician
 J. Martin Burke, American legal scholar and Professor of Law
 Jack Burke (disambiguation), multiple people, including:
 Jack Burke Jr. (born 1923), American golfer
 Jack Burke Sr. (1888–1943), American golfer
 Jack Burke (boxer) (1875–1942), American boxer known for fighting the longest boxing match in history
 Jack Burke (footballer) (1918–2004), Australian footballer, who played for Hawthorn
 Jack Burke (cyclist) (born 1995), Canadian cyclist
 Jackson Burke (1908–1975), American type and book designer
 Jacqui Burke (born 1953), Australian politician,
 James Burke (disambiguation), multiple people, including:
 James F. Burke (politician) (1867–1932), United States Representative from Pennsylvania
 James Burke (Australian politician) (born 1971), member of the Northern Territory Legislative Assembly
 James Burke (Cork politician) (died 1936), Irish Cumann na nGaedhael politician and barrister
 James Burke (Roscommon politician) (died 1964), Irish Fine Gael politician and farmer
 James A. Burke (New York politician) (1890–1965), New York City politician and Queens Borough President
 James A. Burke (Massachusetts politician) (1910–1983), U.S. Congressman from Massachusetts
 James Edmund Burke (1849–1943), American politician and Mayor of Burlington, Vermont
 James Burke (boxer) (1809–1845), English boxer
 James Burke (cricketer) (born 1991), English cricketer
 James Burke (19th-century footballer), 19th-century football player
 James Burke (footballer, born 1994), football player currently playing for Hyde United
 James Burke (Dublin hurler), inter county senior hurler with Dublin
 James Burke (Kildare hurler) (born 1999), Irish hurler
 James Burke (wrestler) (1936–2006), American Olympic wrestler
 Jamie Burke (born 1971), baseball player
 Jamie Burke (rugby union) (born 1980), American rugby union player
 James Burke (baseball), American baseball player for the 1884 Boston Reds
 Jimmy Burke (baseball) (1874–1942), American baseball player
 James Burke (bishop) (1926–1994), American-born Catholic bishop in Peru
 James Burke (science historian) (born 1936), British broadcaster, author, and television producer
 James E. Burke (1925–2012), CEO of Johnson & Johnson
 James Cobb Burke 1915–1964), American photographer and photojournalist
 James Burke (actor) (1886–1968), appeared in The Maltese Falcon and numerous other films
 James Lee Burke (born 1936), American author
 James Burke (gangster) (1931–1996), Irish-American gangster
 E. James Burke (born 1949), justice of the Wyoming Supreme Court
 James Burke (space engineer) (born 1925), lunar settlement and exploration expert, known for the Ranger program
 James F. Burke (musician) (1923–1981), American cornet soloist
 James F. Burke (disambiguation), multiple people, including:
 James F. Burke (politician) (1867–1932), United States Representative from Pennsylvania
 James F. Burke (musician) (1923–1981), American cornet soloist
 Jamie Burke (born 1971), Major League Baseball catcher for the Seattle Mariners
 Jan Burke (born 1953), American author of novels and short stories
 Janine Burke, Australian author, art historian, biographer and novelist
 Jarrad Burke (born 1983) is an Australian cricketer 
 Jason Burke (born 1970), British author and journalist
 Jasmine Burke (born 1983), American actress
 Jean Dadario Burke, American television soap opera producer and director
 Jennifer Burke or Jennifer Lo or Jennifer Mather, Canadian television journalist
 Jerry Burke (1911–1965), American musician
 Jim Burke (disambiguation), multiple people, including:
 Jim Burke (author) (born 1961), American author
 Jim Burke (cricketer) (1930–1979), Australian cricketer
 Jim Burke (illustrator) (born 1973), American illustrator
 Jim Burke (–1994), the real name of the prolific letter column contributor T. M. Maple
 Mr. B The Gentleman Rhymer (Jim Burke), British parodist and rapper
 Jim Burke (film producer), American film producer who frequently collaborates with Alexander Payne and Jim Taylor
 Jimmy Burke (disambiguation), multiple people, including:
 James Burke (gangster) (1931–1996), Irish-American gangster
 Jimmy Burke (baseball) (1874–1942), American baseball player
 Joan Burke or Joan Crowley (1928–2016), Irish Fine Gael politician, farmer and nurse
 John Burke (disambiguation), multiple people, including:
 John mac Richard Mór Burke, 10th Clanricarde or Mac William Uachtar (d. 1536), Irish chieftain and noble
 John Burke, 9th Earl of Clanricarde (1642–1722), Irish soldier and peer
 John Smith de Burgh, 11th Earl of Clanricarde or John Smith Burke (1720–1782), Irish peer
 John Burke, Baron Leitrim or John "na Seamer" Burke or Seán mac an Iarla a Búrc, 1st Baron Leitrim (d. 1583), Irish noble
 Sir John Burke, 2nd Baronet (1782–1847), Irish soldier and MP for Galway County
 John Burke (North Dakota politician) (1859–1937), 10th Governor of North Dakota and Treasurer of the United States
 John H. Burke (1894–1951), American lawyer, real estate broker, and politician
 John Francis Burke (1923–2006), Canadian politician
 John Burke (mayor) (born 1946), mayor of Porirua City New Zealand, 1983–1998
 John R. Burke (1924–1993), U.S. ambassador to Guyana
 John P. Burke (born 1954), American politician in Massachusetts
 John Burke (Rhode Island politician), member of the Rhode Island Senate
 John Burke (spy) (1830–1871), Confederate spy in the American Civil War
 John Burke (colonel) (1838–1914), officer in the Union Army during the American Civil War
 John Oge Burke (d. 1601), Irish gentleman and soldier
 Johnny Burke (lyricist) (1908–1964), American songwriter
 John Burke (composer) (1951–2020), Canadian composer
 Johnny Burke (Newfoundland songwriter) (1851–1930), Newfoundland songwriter
 Johnny Burke (Canadian singer) (died 2017), Canadian country singer
 John Burke (American pianist) (born 1988), American composer & pianist
 John Burke (1900s pitcher) (1877–1950), U.S. baseball player for the New York Giants
 John Burke (1990s pitcher) (born 1970), U.S. baseball player for the Colorado Rockies and the University of Florida
 John Burke (American football) (born 1971), played for the New England Patriots, New York Jets and San Diego Chargers
 John Burke (footballer, fl. 1927–35), Irish footballer from Tipperary
 Johnny Burke (footballer) (1911–1987), Irish footballer
 John Burke (footballer, born 1956), Irish footballer from Dublin
 John Burke (footballer, born 1962), Scottish footballer for Exeter City and Chester City
 John Burke (rugby league, born 1948) (1948–2013), rugby league footballer of the 1970s for Leeds, Keighley
 John Burke (rugby league, born 1957), rugby league footballer of the 1970s for Wigan, and Workington Town
 Jack Burke Sr. (John Burke, 1888–1943), American golfer
 Jack Burke Jr. (John Burke, born 1923), American golfer
 John MacSeonin Burke, Archbishop of Tuam, 1441–1450
 John J. Burke (1875–1936), Paulist priest and editor of the Catholic World
 John Burke (genealogist) (1786–1848), Irish genealogist, founder of Burke's Peerage
 Sir John Bernard Burke (1814–1892), British genealogist
 John F. Burke (1922–2011), American medical researcher and co-inventor of synthetic skin in 1981
 Arizona John Burke (1842–1917), American publicist, press agent and author
 John Burke (author) (1922–2011), English writer of novels and short stories
 John Burke (artist) (1946–2006), Irish artist
 John Burke (photographer), 19th century British photographer
 John M. Burke (born 2001), American chess player
 John Burke, president of Trek Bicycle Corporation
 Jordan Burke, English rugby league footballer 
 Joseph Burke (disambiguation), multiple people, including:
 Joe Burke (composer) (1884–1950), American actor, composer and pianist
 Joe Burke (accordionist) (1939–2021), Irish accordion player
 Joe Burke (baseball executive) (1923–1992), baseball executive
 Joseph Burke (actor) (born 1945), American actor
 Joe Burke (baseball executive) (1923–1992), American Major League Baseball executive
 Joseph Burke (cricketer) (1923–2005), Irish cricketer
 Joe Burke (infielder) (1867–1940), 19th-century baseball player
 Joe Burke (outfielder), baseball right fielder in the Negro leagues
 Joe Burke (New Zealand footballer), New Zealand international football (soccer) player
 Joe Burke (rugby league) (born 1990), rugby league footballer for Wales, and South Wales Scorpions
 Joe Burke (American football) (born 1961), American football player
 Joseph Burke (botanist) (1812–1873), English collector of plants and animals
 Joseph Burke (politician) (1853– after 1888), land surveyor and political figure in Manitoba
 Joseph A. Burke (1886–1962), bishop of Buffalo
 Joseph Burke (judge) (1888–1990), Illinois judge
 Joseph C. Burke (born 1932), American educator
 Sir Joseph Burke, 11th Baronet of the Burke baronets
 Sonny Burke (Joseph Francis Burke, 1914–1980), American musician
 Joy Burke or Bao Hsi-le (born 1990), Taiwanese-American basketball player
 Junior Burke, American fiction writer, songwriter and educator

K

 Kamar Burke (born 1986), Canadian professional basketball player
 Kareem Burke (born 1974), American entrepreneur and record executive
 Karen Burke (born 1971), English footballer
 Karen Danczuk or Karen Burke, British politician and campaigner
 Kathleen Burke or Kathleen B. Burke (1913–1980), American actress and model
 Kathleen Burke Hale or Kathleen Burke Peabody McLean Hale (1887–1958), British-American philanthropist and war worker
 Kathy Burke (born 1964), English actress, comic and theatre director
 Kealan Patrick Burke (born 1976), Iriah author
 Kelly Burke (born 1944), American model
 Kelly M. Burke, American Democratic politician and member of the Illinois House of Representatives
 Keni Burke or Kenneth M. Burke (born 1953), American singer, songwriter, record producer, and multi-instrumentalist
 Kenn Burke, Scottish ballet dancer
 Kennedy Burke (born 1997), American professional basketball player 
 Kenneth Burke (1897–1993), American literary theorist and philosopher
 Kerry Burke or Sir Thomas Kerry Burke (born 24 March 1942), New Zealand politician
 Kerry Burke (rugby league), Australian former rugby league footballer
 Kerry Burke (reporter) American city reporter for the New York Daily News
 Kevin Burke (disambiguation), multiple people, including:
 Kevin Burke (musician) (born 1950), Irish fiddler
 Kevin Burke (CEO), chairman, president, and CEO of Consolidated Edison
 Kevin Burke (judge) (born 1950), district judge in Hennepin County, Minnesota
 Kevin Burke (quarterback) (born 1993), college football quarterback, two-time Gagliardi Trophy winner
 Kevin Burke (American football coach), American football coach and wide receiver
 Kevin Burke (hurler), Irish hurler
 Kevin C. A. Burke (1929–2018), British-American geologist, professor of geology and tectonics at the University of Houston, USA
 Kevin M. Burke (born 1946), American attorney and politician in the Massachusetts House of Representatives

L

 Lena Burke or Lena Pérez or Lena (born 1978), Cuban singer-songwriter
 Lenka Pichlíková-Burke (born 1954), American actress 
 Leo Burke (disambiguation), multiple people, including:
 Leo Burke (born 1948), Canadian retired professional wrestler
 Leo Burke (baseball) (born 1934), retired American utility player in Major League Baseball
 Leo Burke (footballer) (1891–1957), Australian rules footballer
 Leon Burke III, American musician
 Leonie Burke or Leonie Hemingway (born 1949), Australian politician
 Les Burke or Leslie Kingston Burke or "Buck" (1902–1975), American baseball player
 Liam Burke (1928–2005), Irish Fine Gael politician
 Liam Burke (hurler), (born 1972), Irish hurler 
 Liles C. Burke (born 1969), American judge 
 Lillian Burke (1879–1952), American artist, teacher, musician and occupational therapist 
 Lillie Burke (d. 1949), American founder of the first African-American sorority
 Lloyd Burke (disambiguation), multiple people, including:
 Lloyd L. Burke, (1924-1999), American Medal of Honor recipient
 Lloyd Hudson Burke (1916-1988), American federal judge
 Louis H. Burke (1905–1986), American lawyer 
 Louise Burke, Australian sports dietitian, academic and author
 Luke Burke (born 1998), English professional footballer 
 Lynn Burke (born 1943), American swimmer

M

 ]]

 Malena Burke (born 1958), Cuban singer
 Marie Burke or Marie Rosa Altfuldisch (later Holt), (1894–1988), English actress
 Margaret Burke Sheridan (1889–1958), Irish opera singer
 Mark Burke (born 1969), English footballer
 Mark Andrew Burke (born 1969), Australian squash player
 Mario Burke (born 1997) is a Barbadian sprinter
 Marshall Burke (born 1959) is a Scottish former footballer
 Martyn Burke (born 1952), Canadian director, novelist and screenwriter
 Marvin Burke (1918– 1994), American NASCAR driver
 Mary Burke (disambiguation), multiple people, including:
 Mary Burke (born 1959) is an American businesswoman
 Mary Burke (basketball) (born 1965), American women's college basketball coach
 Marylouise Burke, American actress
 Mary Burke Washington (1926–2014), American economist
 Mary Griggs Burke (1916–2012), American art collector
 Mary Burke (consort), (c.1560–c.1627), Irish noblewoman and consort of Brian O'Rourke
 Matt Burke (disambiguation), multiple people, including:
 Matt Burke (rugby union, born 1973), Australian rugby union player who represented the Wallabies from 1993 to 2004
 Matt Burke (rugby, born 1964), Australian rugby union and rugby league player who represented the Wallabies from 1984 to 1987
 Matt Burke (American football) (born 1976), American football coach
 Matthew Burke (born ), financial planner and Republican House of Representatives candidate
 Matthew Burke (rugby union, born 1997), Irish rugby union player
 Maud Cunard or Maud Alice Burke (1872– 1948), American-born, London-based society hostess
 Meghann Burke (born 1980), American professional soccer goalkeeper
 Melanie Burke, New Zealand duathlete and triathlete
 Michael Burke (disambiguation), multiple people, including:
 Michael Burke (New South Wales colonial politician) (1843–1909), Australian politician from New South Wales
 Michael E. Burke (1863–1918), American politician from Wisconsin
 Michael Burke (Australian politician) (1865–1937), Australian politician from New South Wales
 Mike Burke (shortstop) (1854–1889), American Major League Baseball player
 Micky Burke (1904–1984), Scottish football forward
 Mick Burke (mountaineer) (1941–1975), English mountaineer and climbing cameraman
 Mick Burke (Gaelic footballer) (born 1941), Irish Gaelic footballer
 Mike Burke (punter) (born 1950), American football punter
 Mick Burke (rugby league) (born 1958), English rugby league footballer
 Mike Burke (strongman) (born 1974), American professional strongman competitor
 Michael Burke (soccer) (born 1977), American Major League Soccer player
 Michael Burke (Gaelic footballer) (born 1985), Irish Gaelic football player
 Michael Burke, 10th Earl of Clanricarde (1686–1726), Irish peer
 Michael Burke (poet) (–1881), Irish poet
 E. Michael Burke (1916–1987), American naval officer, CIA operative, circus, television and sports executive
 Michael Reilly Burke (born 1964), American actor
 Mike Burke (journalist), American journalist and senior producer of Democracy Now!
 Michael Burke (economist), Irish economist
 Michèle Burke or Michèle Burke-Winter, (born 1959), Irish-born Academy Award-winning make-up artist
 Michelle Burke or Michelle Gray (born 1970), American actress
 Mickey Burke (disambiguation), multiple people, including:
 Mickey Burke (footballer) (died 1993), Irish football player
 Mickey Burke (hurler) (born 1927), Irish retired hurler
 Mildred Burke (1915–1989), American professional wrestler
 Miles Burke (1885–1928), American flyweight boxer 
 Mollie Burke, American politician and member of the Vermont House of Representatives 
 Molly Burke (born 1994), Canadian YouTuber and disability rights advocate

N

 Nathan Burke (born 1970), Australian rules footballer
 Nathan Burke (musician), American bassist
 Nazim Burke, Grenadaian politician from Carriacou
 Neil Burke, American musician and artist
 Niamh Reid Burke (born 1991) is an Irish association footballer 
 Nicholas Burke (born 1837), Irish uilleann piper
 Nita Burke (born 1937), Australian basketball player
 Noel Burke (born 1962), Irish singer
 Norah Burke (1907–1976), British novelist, non- fiction and travel writer
 Northcote Burke, Canadian cleric and Dean of New Westminster from 1953 to 1968

O
 Oliver Burke (born 1997), Scottish professional footballer

P

 Paul Burke (disambiguation), multiple people, including:
 Paul Burke (actor) (1926–2009), American actor in TV series Naked City (1960–63) and 12 O'Clock High
 Paul Burke (boxer) (born 1966), English professional lightweight and light welterweight boxer
 Paul Burke (rugby union, born 1973), English born Ireland international
 Paul Burke (rugby union, born 1982), Scottish rugby union player
 Patricia Burke (1917–2003), English singer and actress
 Patrick Burke (disambiguation), multiple people, including:
 Patrick B. Burke (born 1984), Democratic politician from New York
 Patrick Burke (bishop) (1779–1843), bishop of Elphin from 1827 to 1843
 Patrick Burke (Clare politician) (1879–1945), Irish politician from Clare
 Patrick Burke (cricketer) (born 1919), Trinidadian cricketer
 Patrick Burke (Dublin politician) (1904–1985), Irish politician from Dublin
 Patrick Burke (defensive back) (born 1968), Canadian football player
 Patrick Burke (golfer) (born 1962), American golfer
 Patrick F. Burke (1934–2011), American football player, businessman
 Paddy Burke (born 1955), Irish Fine Gael party politician from County Mayo, Senator since 1993
 Paddy Burke (Australian footballer) (1898–1953), Australian rules footballer
 Pat Burke (baseball) (1901–1965), MLB player
 Pat Burke (born 1973), Irish basketball player
 Pat Burke (association footballer) (1892–?), English footballer
 Pat Burke (Gaelic footballer), Irish Gaelic footballer
 Patrick E. Burke (1830–1864), lawyer, Missouri state legislator, and Civil War officer
 Peter Burke (disambiguation), multiple people, including:
 Peter Burke (barrister) (1811–1881), English serjeant-at-law
 Peter Burke (Gaelic footballer) (born 1976), played for Mayo
 Peter Burke (historian) (born 1937), British historian and professor
 Peter Burke (Irish footballer), Irish association footballer
 Peter Burke (politician) (born 1982), Fine Gael TD for Longford–Westmeath
 Peter Burke (rugby union) (1927–2017), New Zealand rugby union player and coach
 Peter Burke (Australian footballer) (born 1964), Australian rules footballer
 Phil Burke (born 1982), Canadian film, television and stage actor
 Philip Burke (born 1956), American caricature artist and illustrator
 Phyllis Le Cappelaine Burke (1900-1969), Australian Catholic women's rights activist

R

 Randy Burke, American football player
 Raymond Burke (disambiguation), multiple people, including:
 Raymond Burke (clarinetist) (1904–1986), New Orleans jazz clarinetist
 Raymond H. Burke (1881–1954), United States politician from Ohi
 Raymond Leo Burke (born 1948), American Roman Catholic prelate
 Raymond Burke (priest) (died 1562), Irish priest
 Ray Burke (Irish politician) (Raphael Patrick Burke, born 1943), Irish politician
 Redmond Burke, Baron Leitrim (fl. 1580s–1602), Irish noble and soldier
 Redmond Burke (born 1958), American surgeon, innovator, software developer, author, and inventor
 Reece Burke (born 1996), English professional footballer 
 Ricard O'Sullivan Burke (1838–1922), Irish nationalist and American soldier, campaigner, and engineer 
 Richard Burke (disambiguation), multiple people, including:
 Richard Burke Jr. (1758–1794), Member of Parliament, son of Edmund Burke
 Richard Burke (Irish politician) (1932–2016), Irish Fine Gael politician and European Commissioner
 Richard Anthony Burke (born 1949), Irish bishop in the Roman Catholic Church
 Richard J. Burke (1915–1999), Irish-American journalist, poet and playwright
 Richard Burke, 2nd Earl of Clanricarde or Richard (Sassanach) Burke (d. 1582), Irish noble
 Richard Burke, 4th Earl of Clanricarde or Richard de Burgh (1572–1635), Irish nobleman and politician
 Richard Burke, 6th Earl of Clanricarde (d. 1666), Irish peer
 Richard Burke, 8th Earl of Clanricarde (died 1709), Irish peer
 Richard Óg Burke, 2nd Clanricarde or Mac William Uachtar (d. 1387), Irish chieftain and noble
 Richard Óge Burke, 7th Clanricarde or Mac William Uachtar (d. 1519), Irish chieftain and noble
 Richard Mór Burke, 9th Clanricarde or Mac William Uachtar (d. 1530), Irish chieftain and noble
 Richard Bacach Burke, 11th Clanricarde or Mac William Uachtar (d. 1538), Irish chieftain and noble
 Dick Burke (footballer, born 1920) (1920–2004), English football player
 Dick Burke (Australian footballer) (born 1938), Australian rules footballer for South Melbourne
 Richard Burke (businessman) (1934–2008), co-founder of Trek Bicycle Corporation
 Richard Burke (Alabama politician) (1807 or 1808 - 1870), Baptist preacher and Alabama state representative
 Ricky Burke (born 1990), Scottish footballer
 Richie Burke (born 1962), British professional footballer 
 Robert Burke (disambiguation), multiple people, including:
 Robert Burke (director) (born 1984), American film director
 Robert John Burke (born 1960), American actor who starred in Robocop 3
 Robert C. Burke (1949–1968), Medal of Honor recipient and United States Marine, killed in action in Vietnam
 Robert Malachy Burke (1907–1998), Irish Christian socialist and philanthropist
 Robert E. Burke (1847–1901), U.S. Representative from Texas
 Robert O'Hara Burke (1821–1861), Australian explorer
 Robert H. Burke (1922–2003), American politician in California
 Robert P. Burke (born 1961), United States Navy admiral
 Robert Easton (actor) (Robert Burke, 1930–2011), American actor
 Ron Burke (disambiguation), multiple people, including:
 Ronald Burke (theologian) (1944-2002), American Roman Catholic theologian
 Ron Burke (sportscaster) (born 1963), American anchor/reporter and television personality
 Ronnie Burke (1921–2003), British footballer
 Ronan Burke (born 1990), Irish hurler 
 Rory Burke (born 1994), Irish rugby union player
 Rosetta Burke (born 1937), American senior officer of the United States Army Reserve
 Ryan Burke (born 2000), Irish professional footballer

S

 Sailor Burke or Charles Presser (1885–1960), American welter and middleweight boxer
 Sam Burke, West Indies cricket umpire
 Samson Burke or Sam Burke (born 1929), Canadian bodybuilder, swimmer, wrestler and actor
 Samuel Burke, American journalist
 Samuel Martin Burke (1906–2010), Pakistani diplomat
 Sarah Burke (1982–2012), Canadian freestyle skier
 Séamus Burke (1893–1967), Irish politician
 Seán Burke (disambiguation), multiple people, including:
 Seán Burke (Gaelic footballer) (born 1970), Irish retired Gaelic footballer
 Seán Burke (hurler), Irish hurler
 Sean Burke (born 1967), Canadian former professional ice hockey goaltender
 Seán Burke (literary theorist) and author
 Sean M. Burke, author, linguist and programmer
 Sean Burke, English musician and former member of Tubeway Army
 Shawn Burke, of Hamilton Tiger-Cats
 Selma Burke (1900–1995), American sculptor 
 Shannon Burke (disambiguation), multiple people, including:
 Shannon Burke, host of the Shannon Burke Show, a radio show on WTKS Real Radio in Orlando, Florida
 Shannon Burke (writer) (born 1966), American novelist and screenwriter
 Simon Burke (born 1961), Australian actor
 Sinéad Burke (born 1990), Irish writer, academic and disability activist
 Solomon Burke (1936/40–2010), American soul singer ("Everybody Needs Somebody to Love")
 Sonny Burke (1914–1980), American musician
 Stanley Burke (1923–2016), Canadian television journalist
 Steve Burke (disambiguation), multiple people, including:
 Steve Burke (baseball) (born 1955), former Major League Baseball pitcher
 Steve Burke (businessman) (born 1958), Chairman of NBCUniversal
 Steve Burke (footballer) (born 1960), English former footballer
 Steve Burke (composer) (born 1974), British video game composer, sound designer and voice actor
 Steven Burke (born 1988), English track and road cyclist
 Stoney Burke (born 1953), American California street performer and actor
 Sue Burke (born 1955), American writer and translator
 Susan Burke (disambiguation), multiple people, including:
 Susan L. Burke (born 1962), American lawyer
 Susan Theresa Burke, American writer, actress and stand-up comic
 Syd Burke (1938–2010), Jamaican-British broadcaster, photographer and journalist
 Sydney Burke (1934–2017), South African cricketer

T

 Tarana Burke (born 1973), American activist
 Ted Burke (1877–1967), Australian rules footballer 
 Teresa Blankmeyer Burke, American philosopher
 Terry Burke (born 1942), Australian politician
 Sir Theobald Burke, 13th Baronet or Theobald Hubert Burke (1833–1909), Irish baronet
 Theresa Burke, Canadian writer, journalist and producer
 Thomas Burke (disambiguation), multiple people, including:
 Thomas Burke (Clare politician) (1876–1951), Irish independent legislator
 Thomas Burke (North Carolina) (–1783), Irish-born physician, lawyer and politician
 Thomas Burke (Seattle) (1849–1925), American jurist and railroad builder
 Sir Thomas Burke, 3rd Baronet (1813–1875), Irish legislator
 Thomas A. Burke (1898–1971), American Democratic city executive and legislator from Ohio
 Thomas Henry Burke (civil servant) (1829–1882), Irish Catholic Permanent Under Secretary in Britain's Irish Office
 Thomas Henry Burke (politician) (1904–1959), American politician from Ohio
 Thomas J. Burke (North Dakota judge) (1896–1966), American jurist; justice of North Dakota Supreme Court
 Tom Burke (Australian politician) (1910–1973), Labor Party legislator for the Division of Perth
 Kerry Burke or Sir Thomas Kerry Burke (born 1942), New Zealand Labour Party Member of Parliament for Rangiora and West Coast
 T. J. Burke (Thomas James Burke, born 1972), American-born Canadian legislator
 Thomas Burke (bishop) (–1776), Irish Roman Catholic clergyman
 Thomas Nicholas Burke (1830–1882), Irish Roman Catholic theologian and preacher
 Thomas Martin Aloysius Burke (1840–1915), Irish-born Roman Catholic clergyman
 Tom Burke (priest) (1923–2008), Irish Carmelite priest, physicist and school teacher
 Tom Burke (footballer, born 1862) (1862–1914), Welsh footballer
 Tom Burke (hurler) (fl. 1865–1887), Irish hurler
 Thomas Burke (athlete) (1875–1929), American sprinter in 1896 Athens Olympics
 Tom Burke (American football) (born 1976), American defensive end in National Football League
 Tom Burke (Irish footballer), Ireland footballer
 William Burke (pirate) (died 1699), sometimes known as Thomas Burke, Irish pirate active in the Caribbean, associate of William Kidd
 Thomas Burke (artist) (1749–1815), Irish engraver and painter known for mezzotint
 Thomas Burke (author) (1886–1945), English poet and author
 Thomas Burke (businessman) (1870–1949), Australian businessman and philanthropist
 Thomas Burke (Irish revolutionary and sportsman) (1894–1967), Irish revolutionary, sportsman and referee
 Thomas Burke (Medal of Honor) (1833–1883), U.S. Navy sailor and peacetime Medal of Honor recipient
 Thomas Burke (soldier) (1842–1902), Medal of Honor recipient for valor on June 30, 1863
 Thomas Burke (tenor) (1890–1969), British operatic tenor
 Thomas Ulick Burke (1826–1867), bank manager and victim of the Break-o-Day murder in gold-rush Victoria
 Tom Burke (actor) (born 1981), English television, film and stage actor
 Tom Burke (environmentalist) (born 1938), British academic and writer on environmental policy issues
 Tomás Burke (fl. 1600–02), Irish gentleman and soldier
 Tim Burke (disambiguation), multiple people, including:
 Tim Burke (ice hockey) (born 1955), American ice hockey player/coach
 Tim Burke (baseball) (born 1959), Major League Baseball pitcher
 Tim Burke (biathlete) (born 1982), American biathlete
 Tim Burke (gridiron football), American football coach
 Tim Burke (visual effects supervisor) (born 1965)
 Tim Burke (wrestler) (1960–2011), American professional wrestler
 Tim Burke (golfer) (born 1986), American golfer
 Timothy Burke (businessman), contractor and railroad owner
 Timothy Burke (politician) (1866–1926), member of the Wisconsin Legislature
 Toby Bourke, Irish singer-songwriter
 Tomás Burke (fl. 1600–02), Irish gentleman and soldier
 Tony Burke (born 1969), Australian politician
 Trey Burke (disambiguation), multiple people, including:
 Trey Burke (born 1992), American basketball player
 Trey Burke (racing driver), (born 2004), American racing driver
Trudy Burke (born 1991), Australian association football player
Tyler Clark Burke, Canadian artist, illustrator, designer, and writer

U

 Ulick Burke (disambiguation), multiple people, including:
 Ulick Burke of Umhaill (died 1343), founder of the Bourkes of the Owles
 Uilleag de Burgh or Sir Ulick Burke, 1st Clanricarde or Mac William Uachtar (d.1343 or 1353), Irish chieftain and noble
 Ulick an Fhiona Burke, 3rd Clanricarde or Mac William Uachtar (d. 1424), Irish chieftain and noble
 Ulick Ruadh Burke, 5th Clanricarde or Mac William Uachtar (d. 1485), Irish chieftain and noble
 Ulick Fionn Burke, 6th Clanricarde or Mac William Uachtar (d. 1509), Irish chieftain and noble
 Ulick Óge Burke, 8th Clanricarde or Mac William Uachtar (d. 1520), Irish chieftain and noble
 Ulick na gCeann Burke, 1st Earl of Clanricarde and 12th Clanricarde or Mac William Uachtar (d. 1544), Irish noble
 Ulick Burke, 3rd Earl of Clanricarde, 3rd Earl of Clanricarde (d. 1601), Irish peer
 Ulick Burke, 1st Marquess of Clanricarde or Ulick MacRichard Burke (1604–1657), Anglo-Irish nobleman
 Ulick Burke, 1st Viscount Galway (–1691), Irish peer and army officer
 Sir Ulick Burke, 3rd Baronet (died 1708), of Glinsk, MP for Galway County
 Ulick Canning de Burgh, Lord Dunkellin (1827–1867), Anglo-Irish soldier and politician
 Ulick de Burgh, 1st Marquess of Clanricarde (1802–1874), British whig politician
 Ulick Burke (politician), Irish Fine Gael politician
 Peter Burke (historian), or Ulick Peter Burke, British historian
 Sir Ulick Burke, 1st Baronet (–) of the Burke Baronets
 Sir Ulick Burke, 8th Baronet (d. 1759) of the Burke Baronets

V
 Vanley Burke (born 1951) is a British Jamaican photographer and artist
 Vern Burke (born April 30, 1941), American football player
 Victor Burke, Irish-born actor, voiceover artist, and entrepreneur
 Vincent Burke (1878–1953), Canadian Newfoundland educator, administrator and Senator
 Vincent Burke (producer) (1952–2022), New Zealand television and film producer
 Vinnie Burke (1921–2001), American jazz bassist
 Virginia M. Burke (1916-1978), American composition and literature scholar

W

 Walter Burke (1908–1984), American actor
 Walter Burke (purser) (1736–1815), English sailor on HMS Victory when Lord Nelson died
 Walter Burke (hurler) (born 1981), Irish hurler
 W.S. Burke or Walter Samuel Burke (born 1861), British outdoorsman, sports writer, editor, entertainer
 Wilfrid Burke (1889–1968), British Trade union organiser and politician
 William Burke (disambiguation), multiple people, including:
 William Burke (pirate) (died 1699), Irish pirate active in the Caribbean, associate of William Kidd
 William Burke (Burke and Hare murders) (1792–1829), Irish-Scots serial killer
 William Burke (author) (1729–1798), English pamphleteer
 William J. Burke (1862–1925), American politician and businessman
 William Burke (baseball) (1865–1939), 19th-century baseball player
 William L. Burke (1941–1996), astronomy, astrophysics, and physics professor at UC Santa Cruz
 William Burke Miller (1904–1983), newspaper and radio reporter
 William Burke (prior) (–), Irish Dominican
 William Malachy Burke (1819–1879), Irish physician and Registrar General
 William H. Burke, head coach of the College of William & Mary's football team in 1899
 William H. Burke Jr. (1906–1975), American political figure
 William mac Ulick Burke, 4th Clanricarde or Mac William Uachtar (d. 1430), Irish chieftain and noble
 William Burke, 7th Earl of Clanricarde (died 1687), Irish peer
 William Burke, Lord of Bealatury (fl. 1580s-1616), Irish noble and soldier
 Willie Burke (born 1972), former Irish footballer
 William Burke-White, American law professor and policy advisor
 Wylie Burke, American geneticist

Y
 Yvonne Burke (disambiguation), multiple people, including:
 Yvonne Brathwaite Burke (born 1932), American politician and lawyer from California
 Yvonne Burke (Garda), (born 1970), Irish police (Garda Síochána) officer

Given name

 Burke Badenhop (born 1983), American professional baseball player
 Burke Boyce (1901–1969), American fencer
 Burke Byrnes (born 1937), American actor
 Burke Cuppage or Sir Burke Douglas Cuppage (1794–1877), British Army officer
 Burke Dales (born 1977), Canadian professional football punter
 Burke Day (1954–2017), American politician
 Burke Deadrich (1945–2012), American wrestler
 Burke Fahling (born 1997), American professional soccer player
 Burke Hanford or Burke Gaius Hanford (1872–1928), American sailor
 Burke Harr (born 1971), American politician from Nebraska
 Burke Henry (born 1979), Canadian professional ice hockey player
 Burke Jackson (born 1949), American rancher and politician
 Burke Jones (1903–1983), American soccer player
 Burke Marshall (1922–2003), American lawyer
 Burke Moses (born 1959), American actor
 Burke Ramsey (born 1987), brother of Jonbenét Ramsey
 Burke Reid, Australian–Canadian record producer and musician
 Burke Riley (1914–2006), American legislator, lawyer and public official 
 Burke Roberts, American underground film director and multimedia artist
 Burke Shelley (1950–2022), Rock musician
 Burke Thomas or Burke Thomas Overdrive, American musician and record producer
 Burke Trend, Baron Trend or Burke Frederick St John Trend (1914–1987), British civil servant
 Burke Trieschmann, Vietnamese composer and sound designer
 Burke W. Whitman, American executive, board director, and former United States Marine Corps general
 Charles Burke Elbrick (1908–1983), American ambassador
 Edmond Roche, 1st Baron Fermoy or Edmond Burke Roche (1815–1874), Irish politician 
 Edmund Roche, 5th Baron Fermoy or Edmund James Burke Roche (1939–1984), British businessman
 Herschel Burke Gilbert (1918–2003), American orchestrator, musical supervisor, and composer
 James Roche, 3rd Baron Fermoy or James Boothby Burke Roche (1851–1920), British peer
 Mary Burke Washington or Mary Cornelia Burke Washington (formerly Mary Burke Nicholas), (1926–2014), American economist
 Morris Burke Belknap (the elder) or Morris Burke Belknap Sr (1780–1877), American industrialist
 Morris B. Belknap or Morris Burke Belknap Jr or "the younger" (1856–1910), American businessman
 Maurice Roche, 4th Baron Fermoy or Edmund Maurice Burke Roche (1885–1955), British Conservative Party politician
 Maurice Roche, 6th Baron Fermoy or (Patrick) Maurice Burke Roche (born 1967), British businessman
 Nadine Burke Harris (born 1975) is a Canadian-American pediatrician 
 Patricia Burke Brogan, Irish playwright, novelist, poet and artist
 Ralph Burke Tyree (1921–1979), American artist
 W. B. Belknap or William Burke Belknap Sr or "the elder" (1811–1889), American businessman
 William Burke Belknap or William Burke Belknap Jr or "the younger" (1885–1965), American entrepreneur and economist
 William B. Garrett III or William Burke Garrett III, American army officer
 William Burke Kirwan (–1880?), Irish painter and murderer

By title
 Attorney General Burke (disambiguation)
 General Burke (disambiguation)
 Governor Burke (disambiguation)
 Justice Burke (disambiguation)
 Senator Burke (disambiguation)

Fictional characters
 Burke, a character from Star Trek VI: The Undiscovered Country
 Burke, the antihero protagonist of the Burke Series of novels by Andrew Vachss
 Burke, a character from Rampage played by Joe Manganiello
 Burke Lapadura, a character in the game Identity V
 Amos Burke, main character in the 1963 television series Burke's Law and its 1994 revival, played by Gene Barry
 Carter J. Burke, a character from the 1986 film Aliens
 Catherine 'Katie' Burke, character in Abandon (film)
 Clyde Burke, a newspaper reporter and one of the agents of The Shadow
 Danny Burke, a character in the 1984 American teen sex comedy movie Revenge of the Nerds
 David Burke, author of a book on Melita Norwood
 David "Bombhead" Burke, a character played by Lee Otway on Hollyoaks
 Doreen Burke, a character from Blow the Man Down (film), played by Marceline Hugot
 Dorothy Burke, a fictional character from the Australian Network Ten soap opera Neighbours
 Elizabeth Burke, a character in the television series White Collar
 Elizabeth Burke, a character in The Faculty
 Hayden Burke, FBI Director from The Silence of the Lambs (film), played by Roger Corman
 Hazel Burke, Shirley Booth's lead character on the NBC/CBS television series, Hazel
 Joseph Burke, a World War II veteran in the novel Double Play from Robert B. Parker
 Juliet Burke, a character from the TV series Lost
 Leslie Burke, a character from Bridge to Terabithia
 DCI Matt Burke, a character in the television series Taggart
 Mel Burke (Hart), a character in the television sitcom Melissa & Joey
 Peter Burke, a character from the TV series White Collar
 Preston Burke, a character on Grey's Anatomy
 Dr Richard Burke, Monica's boyfriend on the television sitcom Friends, played by Tom Selleck
 Rick Burke, a character on the television series 24
 Robert Burke, a hunter and dinosaur expert in the film The Lost World: Jurassic Park
 Detective Sam Burke, a policeman in the Spawn series from Image comics 
 Steve Burke (One Life to Live), a soap opera character 
 Thomas Burke, a character from Final Destination 2
 Thomas Burke, character in Mafia III
 Walter Burke, a character, played by Al Pacino in The Recruit
 Burke Breyer, a fictional character in the film Shazam!
 Burke Dennings, a fictional character played by Jack MacGowran in The Exorcist
 Burke Ryan, a character in the 2009 American romantic drama movie Love Happens

See also
 Burke (disambiguation)
 De Burgh
 House of Burgh, an Anglo-Norman and Hiberno-Norman dynasty founded in 1193
 Bourke (disambiguation)
 Burk (name), given name and surname
 Burkes, surname
 Burkle (surname), surname
 Berg (disambiguation)
 Berkley (disambiguation)
 Birke, given name and surname
 Burgh, an autonomous corporate entity in Scotland
 Burgos, a city of northern Spain
 Burk (disambiguation)
 Burke and Wills
 Burke and Hare
 Burke's Peerage, account of nobility, first published in 1826 by John Burke
 Burke's Landed Gentry, account of families of the land-holding class, first published in 1833 by John Burke

References

English-language surnames
Surnames of Irish origin